Helcogramma fuscopinna, known commonly as the blackfin triplefin, is a species of triplefin blenny in the genus Helcogramma. It was described by Wouter Holleman in 1982.

References

Blacjfin triplefin
Taxa named by Wouter Holleman
Fish described in 1982